Cotachena histricalis is a moth in the family Crambidae. It was described by Francis Walker in 1859.It is found in New Guinea, Indonesia (Tanimbar Islands) and on the Solomon Islands, as well as in China and Australia, where it has been recorded from Queensland.

The wingspan is about 20 mm.

References

Moths described in 1859
Spilomelinae